Varnam is a 1989 Malayalam-language psychological drama film starting Jayaram and Suresh Gopi. As the directorial debut of film director Ashokan, the film received critical acclaim and was well received.

Plot
Haridas moves to the city after his twin sister's death. Still struggling to keep his past, Haridas meet and fall in love with Ammu, the daughter of Major M.K. Nair. He learns that a local politician has cheated him out of a job to Manu, his classmate from college, and also suspects he killed his sister.

Cast
Jayaram as Haridas
Suresh Gopi as Manu Vishwanath
Ranjini as Ammu
Thilakan as Major M. K. Nair
Meena as Major's Wife
Jagathi Sreekumar as Venkidy
Parvathy Jayaram as Revathy
Innocent as Varadan Pillai
Mukesh as Gopan (cameo appearance)
Mamukkoya as himself (cameo appearance)
M. G. Soman as Manu's Brother
Usha as Ammu's Friend
Krishnan Kutty Nair as K. Purushothaman
N. L. Balakrishnan as Unni

Soundtrack
All songs are written by K. Jayakumar.

"Dala Marmaram (female)" - KS Chithra, Chorus
"Olavaalan" - MG Sreekumar
"Neru Neru" - CO Anto, Krishnachandran
"Dala Marmaram (male)" - MG Sreekumar
"Kripaya Paalaya" - MG Sreekumar

External links
 

1989 films
1980s Malayalam-language films
1989 comedy-drama films
Indian comedy-drama films
Indian psychological drama films
1989 directorial debut films
Films scored by Ouseppachan
Films shot in Thiruvananthapuram
1989 comedy films
1989 drama films